Peter McKintosh is a British theatre set and costume designer.

Background
He obtained a degree in Theatre Studies at the University of Warwick and then trained at the Bristol Old Vic Theatre School.

His work as an assistant to Mark Thompson and Richard Hudson included: Joseph and the Technicolour Dreamcoat (Palladium), The Wind in the Willows, Arcadia, The Madness of George III (National Theatre), Eugene Onegin, Manon Lescaut (Glyndebourne), Samson et Dalila (Met)

Career 
Set and costume designs for theatre includes: Guys and Dolls (Marigny, Paris), 42nd Street (Chatelet, Paris), The Wind in The Willows, The 39 Steps, Guys and Dolls, The Importance of Being Earnest, Hay Fever, Harvey, Dirty Rotten Scoundrels, Another Country, Viva Forever!, Death and the Maiden, Butley, Love Story, Prick Up Your Ears, Entertaining Mr Sloane, Donkeys’ Years, The Dumb Waiter, Fiddler on the Roof, A Woman of No Importance, Educating Rita, Shirley Valentine (West End); Shadowlands, The Deep Blue Sea, Guys and Dolls, Uncle Vanya, Antony and Cleopatra, The Scarlet Letter, Just So, Pal Joey, Another Country (Chichester Festival Theatre); Hansel and Gretel, On the Town, Seven Brides for Seven Brothers, The Sound of Music, Crazy For You, Hello Dolly! (Regent’s Park Open Air Theatre); The Winslow Boy (Old Vic/Roundabout, NY); Noises Off (Old Vic/West End/UK tour); Our Country’s Good, The Doctors’ Dilemma, Honk!, Widowers’ Houses (National Theatre); The Heretic (Royal Court); King John, Brand, Pericles, Alice in Wonderland, The Merry Wives of Windsor (Royal Shakespeare Company); Splendour, My Night With Reg (also West End), Luise Miller, Serenading Louie, The Chalk Garden, Be Near Me, The Cryptogram, John Gabriel Borkman, Boston Marriage (Donmar Warehouse); The Turn of the Screw, The Knot of the Heart, Waste, Cloud Nine, Romance (Almeida Theatre).

Set and costume designs for opera include: The Handmaid’s Tale (Royal Danish Opera/English National Opera/Canadian Opera); The Marriage of Figaro (English National Opera); Love Counts, The Silent Twins (Almeida opera).

Awards and nominations
 2012 Olivier Award for Best Costume Design for CRAZY FOR YOU.
 2010 Olivier Award nomination for Best Costume Design for HELLO DOLLY!
 2008 Tony Award nomination for THE 39 STEPS, Best Scenic Design for a Play.
 2008 Tony Award nomination for THE 39 STEPS, Best Costume Design for a Play.

External links 
 https://www.petermckintosh.com
 https://www.ibdb.com/broadway-cast-staff/peter-mckintosh-475103
 http://www.39stepsonbroadway.com
 http://www.love39steps.com
 http://windinthewillowsthemusical.com
 https://openairtheatre.com/production/crazy-for-you-west-end

British scenic designers
British costume designers
Living people
Year of birth missing (living people)
Alumni of the University of Warwick